The genus Caliroa is a group of sawflies in the family Tenthredinidae. The larvae are slimy in appearance, and are sometimes referred to as "slugs" (e.g., the "pear slug"), though they are not gastropods, but insects.

The larvae of some species in this genus are important pests which can do significant damage to the leaves of trees such as oaks, poplars, cherries, and pears. The larvae are covered in slime, making them unpalatable to predators; when fully grown, they drop off the tree and pupate underground.

References

External links
 
 

Tenthredinidae